Anton Hanak (22 March 1875, Brünn – 7 January 1934, Vienna) was an Austrian sculptor and art Professor. His works tend to have a visionary-symbolic character, related to Expressionism.

Biography
He studied with Edmund von Hellmer at the Academy of Fine Arts, Vienna, and was associated with the Vienna Secession. In 1913, he became a teacher at the Kunstgewerbeschule and, after 1932, a Professor at the Academy. His students included Karl Duldig, Fritz Wotruba, Oskar Icha, Ena Rottenberg,  and Pepi Weixlgärtner-Neutra.

During the 1920s, he performed similar work for housing developments by the City of Vienna.

The final project he worked on involved large sculptures for the "Güven Anıtı" (translated as security or trust - literally, "Confidence Monument") in Ankara, which was proposed and initiated in 1931 by Clemens Holzmeister. It was left unfinished at the time of Hanak's death and was completed by Josef Thorak in 1936. The monument has since been damaged twice; by graffiti during the Gezi Park protests (2013), and by shrapnel during the attempted coup in 2016.

He died of a heart attack and was interred at the Hietzinger Friedhof. A street in Vienna's Penzing district is named after him.

Sources

 
 Hugo Haberfeld: "Der Bildhauer Anton Hanak", In: Neues Wiener Journal, Vol. 27, # 9179, 1919, pgs.5–6 (online).
 Friedrich Grassegger, Wolfgang Krug: Anton Hanak (1875–1934). Böhlau, 1997

External links 

 Anton Hanak Museum
 
 

Austrian male sculptors
Austrian people of Czech descent
1875 births
1934 deaths
Academy of Fine Arts Vienna alumni
20th-century Austrian sculptors
Wiener Werkstätte
20th-century Austrian male artists